Tabernaemontana parviflora is a taxonomic synonym that may refer to:

Tabernaemontana parviflora  = Tabernaemontana pandacaqui
Tabernaemontana parviflora  = Tabernaemontana persicariifolia
Tabernaemontana parviflora  = Tabernaemontana rostrata
Tabernaemontana parviflora  = Ichnocarpus frutescens

References